Tarik Hodžić (born 1 December 1951) is a Bosnian-Herzegovinian retired footballer.

Club career
He started playing football with FK Željezničars youth team. In 1970, he signed his first professional contract with the club, but he was loaned out to Famos Hrasnica. He played there for three seasons. After he was the topscorer of Yugoslav second division in 1973 with 28 goals, he then returned to FK Željezničar where he played for two seasons.

After that, he played for Olimpija Ljubljana and then moved to Velež Mostar  where he spent two seasons. He went abroad and signed with Belgian side RFC de Liège where he was the best goalscorer. This excellent striker then went to Turkey. He signed a three-year contract with Galatasaray and he was the topscorer of the Turkish championship in the 1983–1984 season with 16 goals. After three years of playing for this club, he transferred to Sarıyer G.K. in 1984–1985 season. In the 1985–1986 season, he played for Turkish Second Division side Babaeskispor before finishing his career with Bakırköyspor in 1987.

Honours

Player

Club
Galatasaray
Turkish Cup: 1981–82
Turkish Super Cup: 1982

References

External links
 
 Tarik Hodžić Interview (in Bosnian)

1951 births
Living people
Footballers from Sarajevo
Association football forwards
Yugoslav footballers
FK Željezničar Sarajevo players
FK Famos Hrasnica players
NK Olimpija Ljubljana (1945–2005) players
FK Velež Mostar players
RFC Liège players
Galatasaray S.K. footballers
Sarıyer S.K. footballers
Bakırköyspor footballers
Yugoslav First League players
Belgian Pro League players
Süper Lig players
TFF First League players
Yugoslav expatriate footballers
Expatriate footballers in Belgium
Yugoslav expatriate sportspeople in Belgium
Expatriate footballers in Turkey
Yugoslav expatriate sportspeople in Turkey
Bosnia and Herzegovina football managers
FK Željezničar Sarajevo managers